Debreceni Vasutas Sport Club is a professional Hungarian football club, based in Debrecen, Hungary.

Matches

Club record in UEFA competitions
As correct of 23 July 2015. 

Biggest win: 23 July 2015, Debrecen 9–2  Skonto FC, Nagyerdei Stadion, Debrecen
Biggest defeat: 16 September 2010, Debrecen 0–5  FC Metalist Kharkiv, Puskás Ferenc Stadion, Budapest
Appearances in UEFA Champions League:  7
Appearances in UEFA Europa League:  9
Appearances in UEFA Intertoto Cup:  2
Player with most UEFA appearances: 48  Kiss
Top scorers in UEFA club competitions: 10  Sidibe

Record by country of opposition
 Correct as of 20 June 2016

 P – Played; W – Won; D – Drawn; L – Lost

References

External links

European
Hungarian football clubs in international competitions